Rosalina is a genus of foraminifera included in the rotaliid family Rosalinidae.

Rosalina has  a smooth plano-convex to concavo-convex trochospiral test in which the chambers are rapidly enlarging and all visible on the convex spiral side and subtriangular and strongly overlapping on the umbilical side, the final chamber taking up about one-third of the circumference. Sutures on the spiral side are  depressed and oblique, curving back at the periphery. The umbilicus is open, partly covered by  triangular umbilical flaps extending from each chamber of the final whorl. Chamber interiors are simple and undivided with subacute peripheries.  Walls are calcareous, with an organic inner lining, and are distinctly perforate. The aperture is a low interiomarginal arch near the periphery on the umbilical side, with narrow bordering lip.

Rosalina has a stratigraphic range from the Eocene to recent and a cosmopolitan distribution. Related genera include Neoconorbina, Rotorboides, and Semirosalina.

References 

 Joseph A. Cushman, 1950. Foraminifera, their classification and economic use. Harvard University Press, Cambridge, Massachusetts. 4th edition, 1950
 
 Alfred R. Loeblich,jr. and Helen Tappan, 1988. Forminiferal Genera and their classification. Geological Survey of Iran, (e-book) 2005. 

Rosalinidae
Rotaliida genera
Extant Eocene first appearances